Candida bromeliacearum is a yeast species. Its type strain is UNESP 00-103T (=CBS 10002T =NRRL Y-27811T).

References

Further reading

bromeliacearum
Yeasts
Fungi described in 1999